"What Does It Feel Like?" is the second single from Felix da Housecat's album Kittenz and Thee Glitz that features French musician Miss Kittin and Melistar.

Critical reception
Paul Cooper of Pitchfork Media gave a negative review, saying, "Melistar and Miss Kittin join together in blandness."

Track listing
UK CD, Maxi single
 "What Does It Feel Like? (Original)" - 2:37
 "What Does It Feel Like? (Röyksopp Return To The Sun Remix)"- 7:12
 "Control Freaq (No Ears Re-Edit)" - 7:37

Charts

Song usage
"What Does It Feel Like? (Röyksopp Return The Sun Mix)" was used on the mix album Fabric 11 by Swayzak.

References

2001 songs
2001 singles
2002 singles
Felix da Housecat songs
Miss Kittin songs
Songs written by Miss Kittin